Sleepy Hollow is a census-designated place in Marin County, California, United States. Its population as of the 2020 census was 2,401.

History

In 1838, Domingo Sais received a land grant from General Mariano Vallejo known as Cañada de Herrera, which consisted of  covering what is now Sleepy Hollow, Fairfax and segments of San Anselmo. In the 1850s, Sais leased the majority of the land that is now Sleepy Hollow to Harvey Butterfield. Butterfield started a dairy farm on the land, and the long, winding 2-mile trail that is still to this day the only way in and out of the inclusive community became known as "Butterfield's Road". The next person to acquire the land was a man named Peter Austin who was responsible for planting the multitude of poplar and eucalyptus trees that now line the road. Due to foreclosure, Austin was forced to sell the land to the Hotalings, a wealthy family from San Francisco. The Hotalings built a lavish mansion at the end of the two-mile road, and named it "Sleepy Hollow" in honor of "The Legend of Sleepy Hollow", a famous short story written by their friend, author Washington Irving. The Hotalings threw many elaborate parties for hundreds of guests, but soon left the mansion and returned to San Francisco. The next owner of the mansion was Sigmund Herzog, who founded a dairy farm on the property. Later a Chicago syndicate bought the land and attempted to create a luxury hotel complete with golf course, pool, and private man-made lake, but this idea quickly fell through due to the stock market crash prior to the Great Depression.

In the 1930s, Sleepy Hollow boasted the western United States' only "play as you go" 18-hole golf course that became the second largest in the country. In 1939, the land was given to the U.S. Army in order to secretly store ammunition for World War II until the war was over. In 1946, A.G. Raisch bought the mansion and an additional 500 acres. Following the tradition, Raisch threw many luxurious parties for hundreds of guests. He eventually left the estate and it remained unoccupied for several years until it spontaneously caught on fire. The majority of the house burned down, leaving only a wall and a set of steps that still stand today.

Sleepy Hollow became a residential area due to the opening of a real estate company shortly after World War II. In 1966 the Dominican Order of the Catholic Church bought the "Sleepy Hollow" mansion and opened the San Domenico School for Girls. Presently, San Domenico School is a private, co-ed K-12 day school, with boarding in the high school for girls only.

Geography
Sleepy Hollow is in east-central Marin County and is bordered to the south by the town of San Anselmo. The Terra Linda district of San Rafael lies to the east. Though no roads directly connect Sleepy Hollow with Terra Linda, hiking trails do.

Butterfield Road, Sleepy Hollow's main street, is accessed from Sir Francis Drake Boulevard, a major east-west road in Marin County. The community is in ZIP code 94960 and area codes 415 and 628.

Lucas Valley-Marinwood lies to the north of Sleepy Hollow, but there are no roads directly connecting the two unincorporated communities.

Demographics
The 2010 United States Census reported that 2,384 people, 831 households, and 660 families resided in the CDP. The racial makeup of the CDP was 90.6% White (88.5% non-Hispanic), 0.6% African American, 0.4% Native American, 4.7% Asian, 0.3% Pacific Islander, 0.5% from other races, and 3.0% from two or more races. 2.9% of the population was Hispanic or Latino of any race.

The Census reported that 97.1% of the population lived in households, 2.1% lived in non-institutionalized group quarters, and 0.9% were institutionalized.

There were 831 households, out of which 37.7% had children under the age of 18 living in them, 69.2% were opposite-sex married couples living together, 6.4% had a female householder with no husband present, and 3.9% had a male householder with no wife present. 3.7% of households were unmarried opposite-sex partnerships and 0.8% were same-sex married couples or partnerships. 15.0% of households were made up of individuals, and 8.4% had someone living alone who was 65 years of age or older. The average household size was 2.78 and the average family size was 3.05.

The population was spread out, with 26.8% under the age of 18, 5.6% aged 18 to 24, 12.2% aged 25 to 44, 914 people (38.3%) aged 45 to 64, and 17.0% who were 65 years of age or older. The median age was 48.1 years. For every 100 females, there were 94.5 males. For every 100 females age 18 and over, there were 90.9 males.

There were 866 housing units of which 90.7% were owner-occupied and 9.3% were occupied by renters. The homeowner vacancy rate was 0.3%; the rental vacancy rate was 8.3%. 87.8% of the population lived in owner-occupied housing units and 9.2% lived in rental housing units.

Politics
In the state legislature, Sleepy Hollow is in the 3rd Senate District and in the 6th Assembly District.

References

Census-designated places in Marin County, California
San Anselmo, California
Census-designated places in California